Fires of Eden is the eighteenth studio album by American singer Judy Collins released in September 1990 by Columbia Records. It was Collins' first and only release for Columbia. The album was produced by Joel Dorn and Lucy Simon.

Overview
For the album, Collins wrote the album's opening seven-minute track "The Blizzard", she also contributed to the songs "Fortune of Soldiers", "Home Before Dark", "City of Cities", "Queen of the Night", mostly with songwriters Robin Batteau and David Buskin. For the album, a studio version of the song "From A Distance" was recorded, which was presented on the previous album in a live version.

The album failed to chart in any country, but the single "Fires of Eden" peaked at number 31 on the Adult Contemporary chart.

Track listing

References

External links
 

1990 albums
Judy Collins albums
Columbia Records albums
Albums produced by Joel Dorn